Valpak Direct Marketing Systems, Inc., commonly known as Valpak, is a North American direct marketing company owned by Platinum Equity. Valpak provides print, mobile and online advertising and coupons. Valpak distributes some 20 billion coupons in more than 500 million envelopes and millions more through its mobile app and websites every year.

History 
Terry Loebel, an unemployed autoworker, founded Valpak in 1968, using a $500 loan to start mailing coupons from his home to households in Clearwater, Florida. In 1972, Valpak established its first Franchise in Orlando, Florida and by 1982, expanded the business into Canada. A group of investors purchased Valpak from Terry Loebel in 1985. 

In September 1991, Cox Target Media, Inc. purchased Valpak and by 1997, Valpak was mailing out 11 billion coupons a year. In 2005, Valpak opened a St. Petersburg, Florida headquarters with 50,000-square-foot space and had 310 employees. In January 2017, Platinum Equity acquired Valpak along with Savings.com from Cox Target Media, Inc.

Products

Coupon envelopes 

Valpak prints, packages and ships its coupon envelopes from the Valpak Manufacturing Center, a $200-million, 500,000-square-foot print production facility in St. Petersburg. Print inserts in the envelope advertise businesses with coupons for dining, health and beauty, entertainment, automotive, home services and more.

In each of its mailing cycles, Valpak sells the outside of the envelope to select local and national advertisers, who use on-envelope advertising for promotions, marketing campaigns and sweepstakes. Previous advertisers include Food Network, HGTV, CBS and Martha Stewart Living Omnimedia.

Coupon mobile apps 
Valpak launched its mobile coupon app for iPad and iPhone devices in October 2009. Soon after, Valpak launched Android and BlackBerry versions of the mobile app.
Valpak integrates its mobile coupons into digital wallet apps Apple Passbook, Google Wallet, Windows Phone Wallet and Samsung Wallet. The Valpak mobile app is free to download and also features augmented reality  technology.
Valpak Highlights Major Innovations in Data-Driven, Omnichannel Marketing for Local and National Advertisers

References 
13. Valpak Highlights Major Innovations in Data-Driven, Omnichannel Marketing for Local and National Advertisers
Marketing companies of the United States
Marketing companies established in 1968
Promotion and marketing communications
1968 establishments in Florida
Companies based in Clearwater, Florida
[]